Malaga is a sweet fortified wine originating in the Spanish city of Málaga made from Pedro Ximénez and Moscatel grapes. The center of Malaga production is Sierra de Almijara, along with Antequera, Archidona, San Pedro Alcantara, Velez Malaga and Competa, in the Spanish wine region of Málaga DOP. The winemaking history in Malaga and the nearby mountains is one of the oldest in Europe. However, like many of the world’s great dessert wines, demand fell dramatically in the 20th century and it was feared that this wine would soon become extinct. There has been a recent surge in interest in sweet wines, and Malaga wines are finding their place on the world stage. The main wine villages of this appellation include Frigiliana and Vélez. There are many red and white varietals grown, but the only ones used for dessert wines are the Pedro Ximénez and Moscatel.

Malagas classically come in three distinctions (denominación de origen):
 Malaga (mostly sweet white wines)
 Sierra de Malaga (white, rose and red wines)
 Pasas de Malaga (raisins).

References

External links
 

Fortified wine
Dessert wine
Spanish wine